Jim McMillan was lynched in Bibb County, Alabama on June 18, 1919.

Lynching

Racial tension in the Woodstock and Green Pond communities of Bibb County, Alabama worsened over the summer of 1919. Individuals terrorized the black community in southern Bibb County, around Woodstock. The events culminated in a white mob seizing Jim McMillan and taking him into the Alabama bush. He was forced onto a stump and the mob shot him to death.

Arrests
Sheriff R. H. Wood arrested four Bibb County farmers in response to the lynching: J. Blankenshlp, James D. Oglesby, Elisha Green and Tom Russell. They were charged with murder and held in jail in Centreville, Alabama. A special grand jury was summoned by B. F. Miller. on June 23, 1919.

Aftermath

These lynchings were one of several incidents of civil unrest that are now known as the American Red Summer of 1919. Attacks on black communities and white oppression spread to more than three dozen cities and counties. In most cases, white mobs attacked African American neighborhoods. In some cases, black community groups resisted the attacks, especially in Chicago and Washington, D.C. Most deaths occurred in rural areas during events like the Elaine race riot in Arkansas, where an estimated 100 to 240 blacks and 5 whites were killed. Other major events of Red Summer were the Chicago race riot and Washington D.C. Race Riot, which caused 38 and 39 deaths, respectively. Both riots had many more non-fatal injuries and extensive property damage reaching up into the millions of dollars.

Lynchings in Alabama during 1919

See also

Washington race riot of 1919
Mass racial violence in the United States
List of incidents of civil unrest in the United States

Bibliography
Notes

References 

1919 in Alabama
1919 in military history
1919 riots in the United States
June 1919 events
African-American history between emancipation and the civil rights movement
Racially motivated violence against African Americans
Red Summer
Riots and civil disorder in Alabama
White American riots in the United States
1919 deaths
1919 murders in the United States
Deaths by firearm in Alabama
Deaths by person in Alabama
Lynching deaths in Alabama
People murdered in Alabama